Fontainea oraria is a rare rainforest plant growing near the sea on private property near Lennox Head, New South Wales, Australia. The common name is coast fontainea.

A survey in 2005 found there are only ten mature plants, and 45 seedlings or juveniles. Fontainea oraria is listed as critically endangered by extinction.

References

External links

Flickr search: Fontainea oraria

oraria
Trees of Australia
Malpighiales of Australia
Critically endangered flora of Australia
Flora of New South Wales